Cinema of West Bengal, also known as Bengali cinema or Tollywood, is an Indian film industry of Bengali-language motion pictures. It is based in the Tollygunge region of Kolkata, West Bengal, India. The origins of the nickname Tollywood, a portmanteau of the words Tollygunge and Hollywood, dates back to 1932. It was a historically important film industry, at one time the centre of Indian film production. The Bengali film industry is known for producing many of Indian cinema's most critically acclaimed global Parallel Cinema and art films, with several of its filmmakers gaining prominence at the Indian National Film Awards as well as international acclaim.

Ever since Satyajit Ray's Pather Panchali (1955) was awarded Best Human Document at the 1956 Cannes Film Festival, Bengali films frequently appeared in international fora and film festivals for the next several decades. This allowed Bengali filmmakers to reach a global audience. The most influential among them was Satyajit Ray, whose films became successful among European, American and, Asian audiences. His work subsequently had a worldwide impact, with filmmakers such as Martin Scorsese, James Ivory, Abbas Kiarostami, Elia Kazan, François Truffaut, Carlos Saura, Isao Takahata, Wes Anderson and Danny Boyle being influenced by his cinematic style, and many others such as Akira Kurosawa praising his work.

The "youthful coming-of-age dramas that have flooded art houses since the mid-fifties owe a tremendous debt to the Apu trilogy". Kanchenjungha (1962) introduced a narrative structure that resembles later hyperlink cinema. Ray's 1967 script for a film to be called The Alien, which was eventually cancelled, is widely believed to have been the inspiration for Steven Spielberg's E.T. (1982). Ira Sachs' Forty Shades of Blue (2005) was a loose remake of Charulata (1964), and in Gregory Nava's My Family (1995), the final scene is duplicated from the final scene of The World of Apu. Similar references to Ray films are found in recent works such as Sacred Evil (2006), the Elements trilogy of Deepa Mehta, and in films of Jean-Luc Godard.

Another prominent Bengali filmmaker is Mrinal Sen, whose films have been well known for their Marxist views. During his career, Mrinal Sen's films have received awards from major film festivals, including Cannes, Berlin, Venice, Moscow, Karlovy Vary, Montreal, Chicago, and Cairo. Retrospectives of his films have been shown in major cities of the world. Another Bengali filmmaker, Ritwik Ghatak, began reaching a global audience long after his death; beginning in the 1990s, a project to restore Ghatak's films was undertaken, and international exhibitions (and subsequent DVD releases) have belatedly generated an increasingly global audience. Some of his films have strong similarities to later famous international films, such as Ajantrik (1958) resembling the Herbie films (1967–2005), and Bari Theke Paliye (1958) resembling François Truffaut's The 400 Blows (1959) and Another Bengali filmmaker is Tapan Sinha, whose films have been well known for Best literature Adaptation and Larger than life. 

The cinematographer Subrata Mitra, who made his debut with Ray's The Apu Trilogy, also had an important influence on cinematography across the world. One of his most important techniques was bounce lighting, to recreate the effect of daylight on sets. He pioneered the technique while filming Aparajito (1956), the second part of The Apu Trilogy. Some of the experimental techniques which Satyajit Ray pioneered include photo-negative flashbacks and X-ray digressions while filming Pratidwandi (1972).

Etymology
Tollywood was the very first Hollywood-inspired name, dating back to a 1932 article in the American Cinematographer by Wilford E. Deming, an American engineer who was involved in the production of the first Indian sound film. He gave the industry the name Tollywood because the Tollygunge district in which it was based rhymed with "Hollywood", and because Tollygunge was the centre of the cinema of India as a whole at the time much like Hollywood was in the cinema of the United States.

In that same March 1932 article, Deming was also considering the name "Hollygunge" but decided to go with "Tollywood" as the nickname for the Tollygunge area due to "Tolly being a proper name and Gunge meaning locality" in the Bengali language. It was this "chance juxtaposition of two pairs of rhyming syllables," Holly and Tolly, that led to the name "Tollywood" being coined. The name "Tollywood" went on to be used as a nickname for the Bengali film industry by the popular Kolkata-based Junior Statesman youth magazine, establishing a precedent for other film industries to use similar-sounding names. Tollywood later went on to inspire the name "Bollywood" (as the Bombay-based industry overtook the one in Tollygunge), which in turn inspired many other similar names.

History

The history of cinema in Bengal dates to the 1920s when the first "bioscopes" were shown in theatres in Calcutta. Within a decade, Hiralal Sen, considered a stalwart of Victorian era cinema set up the Royal Bioscope Company, producing scenes from the stage productions of a number of popular shows at the Star Theatre, Minerva Theatre, Classic Theatre. Following a long gap after Sen's works, Dhirendra Nath Ganguly (known as D.G.) established the Indo British Film Co, the first Bengali-owned production company, in 1918. However, the first Bengali feature film, Billwamangal, was produced in 1919, under the banner of Madan Theatre. Bilat Ferat was the IBFC's first production in 1921. The Madan Theatre production of Jamai Shashthi was the first Bengali talkie. A long history has been traversed since then, with stalwarts such as Satyajit Ray, Mrinal Sen, Ritwik Ghatak, Tapan Sinha, Ajoy Kar and others earning international acclaim and securing their place in the movie history.

Early development

Silent era: 1919–1930 

Hiralal Sen, India is credited as one of Bengal's, and India's first directors. These were all silent films. Hiralal Sen is also credited as one of the pioneers of advertisement films in India. The first Bengali-language movie was the silent feature Billwamangal, produced by the Madan Theatre Company of Calcutta and released on 8 November 1919, only six years after the first full-length Indian feature film, Raja Harish Chandra, was released.

The early beginnings of the "talking film" industry go back to the early 1930s when it came to British India, and to Calcutta. The movies were originally made in Urdu or Persian to accommodate a specific elite market. One of the earliest known studios was the East India Film Company. The first Bengali film to be made as a talkie was Jamai Shashthi, released in 1931. At this time the early heroes of the Bengali film industry like Pramathesh Barua and Debaki Bose were at the peak of their popularity. Barua also directed movies, exploring new dimensions in Indian cinema. Debaki Bose directed Chandidas in 1932; this film is noted for its breakthrough in recording sound. Sound recordist Mukul Bose found a solution to the problem of spacing out dialogue and frequency modulation.

Rise of the talkie: 1931–1947 

The contribution of the Bengali film industry to Indian film is quite significant. First Bengali talkies Jamai Shashthi (as a short film) was released on 11 April 1931 at Crown Cinema Hall in Calcutta and the first Bengali talkies as full-length feature film Dena Paona was released 30 December 1931 at Chitra Cinema Hall in Calcutta. The industry was based in Tollygunge, an area of South Kolkata, West Bengal that is more elite and artistically inclined than the usual musical cinema fare in India.

Golden era: 1952–1975 

Bengali cinema enjoyed a large, even disproportionate, representation in Indian cinema during this period. They produced directors like Satyajit Ray, who was an Academy Honorary Award winner, and the recipient of India's and France's greatest civilian honours, the Bharat Ratna and Legion of Honor respectively, and Mrinal Sen, who is the recipient of the French distinction of Commander of the Order of Arts and Letters and the Russian Order of Friendship.

Other prominent filmmakers in the Bengali film industry at the time included Ritwik Ghatak, Tapan Sinha and Ajoy Kar. The Bengali film industry has produced classics such as Nagarik (1952), The Apu Trilogy (1955–1959), Jalsaghar (1958), Ajantrik (1958), Neel Akasher Neechey (1959),  Devdas, Devi (1960), Meghe Dhaka Tara (1960), Hatey Bazarey(1967), the Calcutta trilogies (1971–1976), Malyadan (1971) etc. In particular, The Apu Trilogy is frequently listed among the greatest films of all time.

The most well-known Bengali actor to date has been Uttam Kumar while Suchitra Sen is regarded as the most beautiful and influential actress of Bengali cinema. Kumar and Sen were known as "The Eternal Pair" in the late 1950s. Apart from Sen, Sabitri Chatterjee and Sumitra Devi were very popular actresses of the 1950s. Soumitra Chatterjee is a notable actor, having acted in several Satyajit Ray films, and considered as a rival to Uttam Kumar in the 1960s. He is famous for the characterization of Feluda in Sonar Kella (1974) and Joi Baba Felunath (1978), written and directed by Ray. He also played the adult version of Apu in The World of Apu (1959),  directed by Ray.

In the 1960s, Bengal saw a host of talented actresses like Aparna Sen, Sharmila Tagore, Madhabi Mukherjee, Sandhya Roy and, Supriya Devi. Aparna Sen was one of the most successful actresses of the Golden Era. She became the leading heroine of the 1970s and since 1981 she has been directing films. One of the most well-known Bengali actresses was Sharmila Tagore, who debuted in Ray's The World of Apu, and became a major actress in Bengali cinema as well as Bollywood. Despite Suchitra Sen being the greatest actress, Sharmila was the most commercially successful actress in history with films like The World of Apu (1959), Devi (1960), Nayak (1966), Simabaddha (1967), and Aranyer Dinratri (1970).

Utpal Dutt is internationally known for his acting in movies and plays, especially Shakespearean plays. Bhanu Bandopadhyay, Rabi Ghosh, and Anup Kumar were best known for their comic timing, and with their versatile acting talent they stunned the audience and critics.

The pioneers in Bengali film music include Raichand Boral, Pankaj Mullick, and K. C. Dey, all associated with New Theatres Calcutta. The greatest composers of the golden era included Robin Chatterjee, Sudhin Dasgupta, Nachiketa Ghosh, Hemant Kumar etc.

Modern revival: 1990s–2017 

The revival in Bengali cinema dates from the rise of directors such as Shakti Samanta, Tarun Majumdar,
Rituparno Ghosh, Buddhadeb Dasgupta, Aparna Sen,   Suman Ghosh (director) and  Subrata Sen. Rituparno Ghosh made his first film Hirer Angti in 1992 and dominated Bengali cinema until his death in 2013, winning numerous national awards for films like Unishe April, Dahan and Utsab. Aparna Sen made her directorial debut in 1981 with the internationally lauded 36 Chowringhee Lane, which looked at the lives of Anglo-Indians living in Calcutta. Her later films have also been celebrated: Paromitar Ek Din, Mr and Mrs Iyer, 15 Park Avenue, The Japanese Wife, Goynar Baksho, etc. Buddhadeb Dasgupta is best known for award-winning films like Uttara (film), Mondo Meyer Upakhyan, Charachar, Janala.

In turn, they have also turned the cinematic spotlight on Kolkata, acquainting the city with a much wider national and global audience (Kahaani, Piku, Detective Byomkesh Bakshy). Successful Bengali films are getting their Hindi remakes in Bollywood, Marathi Remakes in Marathi Films, Malayalam Remakes In Malayalam Films (Hemlock Society (film), Ramdhanu, Bhooter Bhabishyat , Praktan, Rajkahini). Bengali directors who have found artistic and commercial success in contemporary Hindi films are: Aniruddha Roy Chowdhury, Neeraj Pandey, Sujit Mondal, Ayan Mukerji, Pradeep Sarkar, Shoojit Sircar and Sujoy Ghosh, Srijit Mukherjee .

Modern era: 2017–present 
In recent years, a younger generation of Bengali directors has come to the fore. Many work in the domestic film industry, while others have gone on to Bollywood. Successful films by directors from this generation include Generation Ami, Amazon Obhijaan, Dracula Sir, Nagarkirtan, Praktan, Bibaho Diaries, Asur, Golondaaj, and Kidnap.

This era's notable filmmakers in the black comedy and crime genres include Srijit Mukherji, Arun Roy, Arindam Sil, Raj Chakraborty, Anjan Dutta, and Pratim D Gupta,  Ishaan Ghose. Detective and superhero films have also been popular, owing to the work of directors like Feluda, Byomkesh, Sona Da, Eken Babu, Kakababu, Sankar, Mitin Mashi, Sabor Dasgupta, and Tenida. Dramatic filmmakers include Shiboprosad Mukherjee, Mainak Bhowmick, Indrasis Acharya, Atanu Ghosh, and Sujit Mondal, whereas filmmakers such as Anik Dutta and  Aniket Chattopadhyay primarily work in comedy and satire. Other critically and commercially successful filmmakers include Raja Chanda and Haranath Chakraborty.

During this period, actors such as Prosenjit Chatterjee, Dev, Jeet, Jishu Sengupta, Abir Chatterjee, Anirban Bhattacharya, Parambrata Chatterjee, Ankush Hazra and actresses such as Rituparna Sengupta, Koel Mallick, Swastika Mukherjee, Subhashree Ganguly, Nusrat Jahan, Mimi Chakraborty, Ishaa Saha, Ritabhari Chakraborty have been active.

Budgets
Many of the most critically acclaimed Bengali films were low-budget films, including Satyajit Ray's famous The Apu Trilogy (1955–1959). The first film in the trilogy, Pather Panchali (1955), was produced on a shoestring budget of Rs. 150,000 ($32000) using an amateur cast and crew. All his other films that followed also had low budgets, with his most expensive films since the 60's being The Adventures of Goopy And Bagha (1968) at Rs. 600,000 ($80,000) and Shatranj Ke Khilari (1977) at Rs. 6 million ($230,000).

The Bengali film industry, which had been a beacon for the country's film industry until the 1980s, is in a turnaround mode. At a time when Bollywood continues its roller-coaster ride, there are cheers in the Bengali film industry with several commercial successes. The dark period of the 1990s when Bengali tinsel town was on a steep decline seems like a nightmare that's best forgotten. And, with the money pouring in, producers from other States are now knocking on the doors of Bengali directors. Industry sources say that the best proof of the comeback is seen in the increasing number of cinema houses showing Bengali films. Even a few years ago, of the 800 cinemas in the State, no more than 350 were showing just Bengali films. The remaining had spread their risk showing a mix of either Hindi and English or Hindi and Bengali films. In 2008, nearly 700 theatres were showing Bengali films.

Bombaiyer Bombete, produced by Ramoji Films at a cost of Rs 8 million, recovered its costs within three weeks and earned 20 million in all. The movie has brought back the concept of family entertainment with Sandip Ray's gambit of contemporizing the plot paying him a rich dividend. Admitting that he did not expect this success, he told Life that he was now lining up another such film for release next year. Earlier, a film by award-winning director Buddhadeb Dasgupta's Mondo Meyer Upakhyan (The Tale of a Fallen Girl) produced by Arjoe Entertainments netted nearly Rs 7  million through the sale of overseas rights against a cost of Rs 0.6  million. Haranath Chakraborty His film Sathi (Companion) created a record by recouping over five times its production cost, although the film Chokher Bali, with big names like Aishwarya Rai Bachchan, Rituparno Ghosh and Tagore, failed to yield expected results. The movie, billed at Rs 16.5 million (the highest among Bengali films).
The total number of cinema theatres is approx 400. But there are films like 'Kaler rakhal'(2008)by Sekhar Das which created a huge controversy for its strong political comments on contemporary Bengal, despite its formal brilliance too, was not successful in the box office as the film was unceremoniously withdrawn from the theatres.

Loose and unorganized production activities, dominated and dictated by providers of capital led to the proliferation of sub-standard films, which were most often commercial failures. The recent successes have come through some concerted effort by Parallel Cinema which has tapped the domestic market, even while scouting the overseas ones, hitting the festival circuit somewhere in between. As such, celluloid creations of award-winning directors like Gautam Ghosh, Rituparno Ghosh and Aparna Sen started bringing money for their producers. However, at around the same time, movies in the commercial circuit (directors like to call them mainstream cinema) also started doing well, supported strongly by the response from the semi-urban areas. The big Bollywood banners such as Mukta Arts and Rajshri films are now showing interest in funding Bengali films.

Hollywood houses like Columbia TriStar have made their debut in distributing Bengali movies. According to industry experts, several issues need to be addressed to build on this resurgence and consolidate it. These include inadequate infrastructure, which often compels moviemakers to go outside the State for facilities pushing up costs, poor marketing and distribution, and increasing competition from Bangladeshi films.

Rankings
A number of Satyajit Ray films appeared in the Sight & Sound Critics' Poll of all-time greatest films, including The Apu Trilogy (ranked No. 4 in 1992 if votes are combined), The Music Room (ranked No. 27 in 1992), Charulata (ranked No. 41 in 1992) and Days and Nights in the Forest (ranked No. 81 in 1982). The 2002 Sight & Sound critics' and directors' poll also included the Ritwik Ghatak films Meghe Dhaka Tara (ranked #231) and Komal Gandhar (ranked #346).

In 1998, the critics' poll conducted by the Asian film magazine Cinemaya included The Apu Trilogy (ranked No. 1 if votes are combined), Ray's Charulata and The Music Room (both tied at #11), and Ghatak's Subarnarekha (also tied at #11). In 1999, The Village Voice top 250 "Best Film of the Century" critics' poll also included The Apu Trilogy (ranked No. 5 if votes are combined). In 2005, The Apu Trilogy was also included in Time All-Time 100 Movies list. In 1992, the Sight & Sound Critics' Poll ranked Ray at No. 7 in its list of "Top 10 Directors" of all time, and Days and Nights in the Forest (ranked No. 81 in 1982).

National Board of Review (USA)
National Board of Review Award for Best Foreign Language Film: Satyajit Ray (1958- Pather Panchali & 1960- The World of Apu)

The Annual Academy Awards (Oscars)
Academy Honorary Award: Satyajit Ray (1992- "In recognition of his rare mastery of the art of motion pictures, and of his profound humanitarian outlook, which has had an indelible influence on filmmakers and audiences throughout the world.")

National Award

The National Film Award for Best Feature Film in Bengali is one of the National Film Awards presented annually by the Directorate of Film Festivals, the organization set up by Ministry of Information and Broadcasting, India. It is one of several awards presented for feature films and awarded with Rajat Kamal (Silver Lotus).

The National Film Awards, established in 1954, are the most prominent film awards in India that merit the best of the Indian cinema. The ceremony also presents awards for films in various regional languages.

Regional awards
 Bengal Film Journalists' Association Awards -The oldest Association of Film critics in India, founded in 1937, by the inspiration and determination of the handful of pioneers amongst the then thin section of scribes that were drawn to film journalism with a lofty mission to serve the developing film journalism and film industry.
 Anandalok Awards -Ceremony is one of the most prominent film events given for Bengali cinema in India
 Kalakar Awards -Ceremony is recognized as one of the topmost awards ceremonies of the eastern region of India.
 Tellysamman Awards -Sangbad Pratidin, a Kolkata-based Bengali daily organized this Award Ceremony.
 Zee Bangla Gourab Somman Awards -These awards are designed for the people by the people. Zee Bangla would be honouring the rich culture and tradition of the land and felicitating the evergreen personalities from the field of theatre, film, music, and our own television shows.
 Filmfare Awards East
 Films and Frames Digital Film Awards

See also

 Lists of Bengali films
 Cinema of Bangladesh
 List of highest-grossing Bengali films

References

Notes
 
Aamar Ami(Bengali)-Uttam Kumar Chattopadhyay—Dey's Publishing, Calcutta,1980
Aamar Jug Aamar Gaan(Bengali)—Pankaj Kumar Mullick—Firma KLM Pvt Ltd., Calcutta 1980
Chalacchitrer Antormahol by Chakraborty Piyali, Banerjee Santanu, Publisher=Suhrid Publication, 1st ed. (2013); ISBN No.: 978-81-92151-97-7
Banala Bhashay Chalachchdra Charcha(Bengali)-Ehfi Tathya, aanji Opanhr r Bha charyr CharK Goswami, Tapas Paul—North Calcutta Film Society, Calcutta, 1995
Bangla Chalachchdra Shilper llihas (1897–1947)(Bengali)—Kalish Mukhapadhyay—Poop I lancha Prahashi
Bangla Chalachchdrer llihas (1st Part)(Bengali)-Pranab Kumar Biswas Samakal Prakashani, Calcul
Bangla Sahhya O Bangla Chalachchitra (1st Part)(Bengali)-Jishh Kumar Mukhapadhyay—Ananda~ha
Banglar Chalachchitrakar—Nisht Kumar Mukhopadhyay—Slanda Pu ishrs, Calcr
Banglar Nat-Nati—Sudhir Basu—Calcutta, 1933
 Cniirabani Chitr barshihi ^119520ed. 60ur Chattopadhyay & Sunil Gar~adhya~Ch^ar$b
Cinema anr I—Ri ih Kumar Ghatah— h
Rhrw Memorial Trust, Calcu^na, 1987
Filrnography of Sixty En inentlndian Movie Makers—Ft I Ra M
Nirbah Juger Chhayaloher Katha—Premanhur at rth —~ kudta
Sonar Daag—60uranga Prasad Ghosh~oc^frnaya Prakashani, Calculla, 1982
Bengali Film Directory– ed. by Ansu Sur, Nandan, Calcutta, 1999
70 years of Indian Cinema, ed. by T.N. Ramachandran, Cinemaa India International, Bombay, 1985
A Pictorial History of Indian Cinema, Firoj Rangogoonwalla, The Hamlyn Publishing Group, London, 1979
Cinematography to Videography: Aesthetics and Technology by Chakraborty Piyali, Banerjee Santanu, Published by Kalyani Foundation, 1st ed. (2013); ISBN No.: 978-81-927505-3-8
Encyclopedia of Indian Cinema – Ashish Rajadhyaksha, Paul Willemen, Oxford University Press, New Delhi, 1994

External links

 
Culture of West Bengal
Cinema of Bengal